Elliot Spiro Valenstein (December 9, 1923 – January 12, 2023) was an American psychologist who was professor of psychology and neuroscience at the University of Michigan. He is a noted authority on brain stimulation and psychosurgery.

Biography
Valenstein was born in New York City on December 9, 1923, to Louis and Helen Valenstein (formally Spiro). He fought in World War II. After returning from the war he attended City College of New York for his B.S. and University of Kansas for his M.A and PhD.

Valenstein was the chief of the neuropsychology section at Walter Reed Institute Research from 1957 to 1961. He started teaching at University of Michigan in 1970.

Valenstein was married to Thelma Lewis from 1947 until her death on December 13, 2020. They have two children together; Paul and Carl. Valenstein died in Ann Arbor, Michigan, on January 12, 2023, at the age of 99.

Published books
 Brain Control: A Critical Examination of Brain Stimulation and Psychosurgery (1973)
 Brain Stimulation and Motivation: Research and Commentary (Ed.) (1973)
 Great and Desperate Cures: The Rise and Decline of psychosurgery and other Radical Treatments for Mental Illness (1986)
 Blaming the Brain: The Truth About Drugs and Mental Health (1998)
 The War of the Soups and the Sparks: The Discovery of Neurotransmitters and the Dispute over how Nerves Communicate (2005)

See also

 Biopsychiatry controversy
 Chemical imbalance theory
 Psychiatric drugs

References

External links
 Faculty Page at University of Michigan
 StayFreeMagazine.org - 'Better Living Through Lobotomy: What can the history of psychosurgery tell us about medicine today? An Interview with Elliot Valenstein', Allison Xantha Miller (Fall, 2003)

1923 births
2023 deaths
20th-century American psychologists
21st-century American psychologists
American neuroscientists
University of Michigan faculty
American military personnel of World War II
City College of New York alumni
University of Kansas alumni
People from New York City